Marc-Émile Ruchet (14 September 1853, in Bex – 13 July 1912, in Bex) was a French-speaking Swiss politician.

He was elected to the Swiss Federal Council on 14 December 1899 and resigned on 9 July 1912, only four days before his death. He was affiliated with the Free Democratic Party. 

While in office he held the following departments:
 Department of Home Affairs (1900 –1903)
 Department of Finance (1904)
 Political Department (1905)
 Department of Home Affairs (1906–1910)
 Political Department (1911)
 Department of Home Affairs (1912)
He was President of the Confederation twice, in 1905 and 1911.

References

External links 

1853 births
1912 deaths
People from Aigle District
Swiss Calvinist and Reformed Christians
Free Democratic Party of Switzerland politicians
Members of the Federal Council (Switzerland)
Finance ministers of Switzerland
Members of the Council of States (Switzerland)
University of Lausanne alumni
Foreign ministers of Switzerland